Inter Boyarka was a Ukrainian football club that last played in Boyarka, Kyiv Oblast during Ukrainian Second League 2006-07 season. The club was led by Volodymyr Smovzh and Borys Rudenko.

History
The club is considered to be a descendant of FC Systema-Boreks Borodianka. On decision of the Kyiv Oblast Football Federation the Borodianka club was replaced with FC Boyarka-2006 from Boyarka, Kyiv Oblast. Next season the new club changed its name to Inter. In 2007 the club folded.

League and cup history

{|class="wikitable"
|-bgcolor="#efefef"
! Season
! Div.
! Pos.
! Pl.
! W
! D
! L
! GS
! GA
! P
!Domestic Cup
!colspan=2|Europe
!Notes
|-
|align=center|2005–06
|align=center rowspan=2|3rd "A"
|align=center|15
|align=center|28
|align=center|2
|align=center|3
|align=center|23
|align=center|13
|align=center|82
|align=center|9
|align=center|1/32 finals
|align=center|
|align=center|
|align=center|the club replaced Osvita Kyiv
|-
|align=center|2006–07
|align=center|15
|align=center|28
|align=center|3
|align=center|6
|align=center|19
|align=center|17
|align=center|61
|align=center|15
|align=center|1/32 finals
|align=center|
|align=center|
|align=center|Renamed — Folded
|}

Head coaches
 Volodymyr Smovzh (Apr 8, 2006)
 Borys Rudenko (Apr 13, 2006 – Apr 19, 2006) (caretaker)
 Volodymyr Smovzh (Apr 26, 2006 – Jun, 2006)
 Borys Rudenko (Jul 31, 2006 – Aug 15, 2006) (caretaker)
 Volodymyr Smovzh (Aug 20, 2006 – Jun, 2007)

Notable Player
Andriy Vitoshynskyi

See also
 FC Systema-Boreks Borodianka

References

 
Inter Boyarka, FC
Inter Boyarka, FC
Association football clubs established in 2005
Association football clubs disestablished in 2007
2005 establishments in Ukraine
2007 disestablishments in Ukraine